Vladimir Castellón Colque (born August 12, 1989, in Cochabamba) is a Bolivian football striker currently playing for Wilstermann in the Bolivian Primera División.

Castellón was singled out as a star in 2008 when he helped Aurora win their first ever title in the club's history by scoring 12 times in the championship. He is a physical striker despite his nonthreatening appearance.

International career
Castellón was part of the Bolivia U-20 squad that participated in the 2009 South American U-20 Championship playing in two games. On October 14, 2014, he made his debut with the senior national team under interim manager Mauricio Soria in an international friendly against Chile with a 2–2 draw played in Coquimbo.

Honours

Club
 Aurora
 Liga de Fútbol Profesional Boliviano: 2008 (C)

External links 
Vladimir Castellón Statistics at BoliviaGol.com 
 

1989 births
Living people
Sportspeople from Cochabamba
Bolivian footballers
Bolivian expatriate footballers
Association football forwards
Club Aurora players
Club Blooming players
Guabirá players
Xelajú MC players
Nacional Potosí players
Club Bolívar players
Bolivian Primera División players
Liga Nacional de Fútbol de Guatemala players
Expatriate footballers in Guatemala
Bolivian expatriate sportspeople in Guatemala